

Places 
Koskela is a district in Helsinki, Finland.
Koskela is a district in Oulu, Finland.

Other uses 
Koskela (surname)
Koskela Light, a sector light tower in Oulu, Finland